Agostino Landolfi, O.S.A. (Latin: Augustinus Landulfus) (died 1532) was a Roman Catholic prelate who served as Bishop of Montepeloso (1528–1532).

Biography
Agostino Landolfi was ordained a priest in the Order of Saint Augustine.
On 23 March 1528, he was appointed during the papacy of Pope Clement VII as Bishop of Montepeloso.
He served as Bishop of Montepeloso until his death in 1532.

References

External links and additional sources
 (Chronology of Bishops) 
 (Chronology of Bishops) 

16th-century Italian Roman Catholic bishops
Bishops appointed by Pope Clement VII
1532 deaths